Anders Rasmus Frihagen (28 January 1892 - 5 April 1979) was a Norwegian politician for the Labour Party. He was Minister of Trade 1939–1940, government representative in Stockholm 1940–1942, Minister of Trade again in 1942 and Minister of Provisioning 1942–1945. Frihagen was a bank director by profession.

References

1892 births
1979 deaths
Government ministers of Norway
Norwegian people of World War II
Labour Party (Norway) politicians